Australians in Film (AiF) is a Los Angeles-based non-profit organization that serves the Australian community working in the film and television industry. It awards the annual Heath Ledger Scholarship to emerging Australian actors, as well as several other programs which help actors and filmmakers to develop their careers.

History

Australians in Film was founded in Los Angeles, California, in May 2001, to celebrate and support Australian film and TV makers and their work.

In 2008, Australians in Film established the annual Heath Ledger Scholarship, named in honor of Australian actor Heath Ledger, who was an ambassador of the group.

In 2012 the organization established an Annual Benefit Dinner to raise funds for scholarships and career development programs. The honorees at the first event included John Polson, Liam Hemsworth and Yvonne Strahovski. In 2013, Australians in Film launched the Orry-Kelly International Award for Australians who have achieved in the film and TV business overseas.

In 2015, Australians in Film announced that Foxtel will become the naming rights sponsor of the Breakthrough Awards.

Description

AiF is based at the Raleigh Studios in Hollywood, occupying a shared workspace known as Charlie's.

 AiF has over 700 members, who included actors, filmmakers and people from the U.S. film industry.

Governance and funding

 producer Emma Cooper is chair of the board that oversees the organisation.

AiF is supported by Screen Australia, Screen NSW, Screen Queensland, Film Victoria, AFTRS and the University of Melbourne (Victorian College of the Arts), as well as commercial partners including Ausfilm, Animal Logic, Bird in Hand winery, Yowie Chocolates, Penfolds and Raynor & Associates.

Programs and awards

AiF runs a number of programs to help Australian actors and filmmakers to develop their careers, including the Heath Ledger Scholarship (for actors), Untapped (for emerging writers and directors); Gateway (for established writers and directors); Exchange (for producers); Mentor LA, Animal Logic Entertainment Internship, and Charlie's Labs.

Heath Ledger Scholarship

The Heath Ledger Scholarship includes a $US10,000 cash prize; a return economy flight to the US; and administrative and educational support for the actor's career.

Winners include:
2009 Oliver Ackland
2010 Bella Heathcote
2011 Ryan Corr
2012 Anna McGahan
2013 James Mackay
2014 Cody Fern
2015 Matt Levett
2016 Ashleigh Cummings
2017 Mojean Aria
2018 Charmaine Bingwa
2021 Rahel Romahn

Breakthrough Award winners
2010 Chris Hemsworth and Ryan Kwanten
2011 Joel Edgerton, Teresa Palmer, and David Michôd
2012 Liam Hemsworth, and Yvonne Strahovski
2013 Jacki Weaver, Sullivan Stapleton, and Alex O'Loughlin
2014 Margot Robbie and Brenton Thwaites
2015 Elizabeth Debicki
2016 Jai Courtney, Garth Davies 
2017 Alethea Jones, Warwick Thornton, Katherine Langford, and Danielle Macdonald
2018 Keiynan Lonsdale, Eliza Scanlen, Margot Robbie, Chris Hemsworth, Warwick Thornton, Elizabeth Debicki, Joel Edgerton, Katherine Langford, James Wan, and Mia Wasikowska

International honorees
2012 John Polson
2013 Baz Luhrmann, Blue-Tongue Films and Steve Papazian (of Warner Bros.) 
2014 Greg Coote (formerly of Dune Entertainment), Anthony LaPaglia, Zareh Nalbandian (of Animal Logic), and Fred Baron (of 20th Century Fox)
2015 Bruna Papandrea, Bill Mechanic and Dion Beebe
2016 Sir Ridley Scott, Greg Basser and James Wan
2017 Tim Minchin, Paul Steinke & Mary Ann Hughes and Luke Davies
2018 Lee Smith, Mark Johnson

References

External links

 *
Non-profit organizations based in Los Angeles